Dual or Duals may refer to:

Paired/two things
 Dual (mathematics), a notion of paired concepts that mirror one another
 Dual (category theory), a formalization of mathematical duality
 see more cases in :Category:Duality theories
 Dual (grammatical number), a grammatical category used in some languages
 Dual county, a Gaelic games county which in both Gaelic football and hurling
 Dual diagnosis, a psychiatric diagnosis of co-occurrence of substance abuse and a mental problem
 Dual fertilization, simultaneous application of a P-type and N-type fertilizer
 Dual impedance, electrical circuits that are the dual of each other
 Dual SIM cellphone supporting use of two SIMs
 Aerochute International Dual a two-seat Australian powered parachute design

Acronyms and other uses
 Dual (brand), a manufacturer of Hifi equipment
 DUAL (cognitive architecture), an artificial intelligence design model
 DUAL algorithm, or diffusing update algorithm, used to update Internet protocol routing tables
 Dual language, alternative spelling of the Australian Aboriginal Dhuwal language
 DUAL table, a special one-row and one-column database table
 Dual-Ghia, US-brand of luxury-car of the late 1950s

Media 
 Dual (2008 film), a 2008 western drama film
 Dual (2022 film), a 2022 science fiction thriller film
 "Dual" (Heroes), an episode of Heroes
 Dual! Parallel Trouble Adventure, an anime series
 Dual (album), an album of traditional Scottish and Irish music recorded by Éamonn Doorley, Muireann Nic Amhlaoibh, Julie Fowlis and Ross Martin, released 2008
 Dual (EP), a 2013 EP by Sampha
 Duals, an album by U2
 The Duals, American duo

See also

Duality (disambiguation)
Duel (disambiguation), a homonym

Double (disambiguation)
Duo (disambiguation)
Pair (disambiguation)
Twin (disambiguation)